Chibuto is a city located in the province of Gaza in Mozambique, about 200 km north of the capital, Maputo.  It is the principal city of Chibuto District and is served by Chibuto Airport.

Demographics

References

Chibuto District
Populated places in Gaza Province